Psophocarpus is a genus of flowering plants in the legume family, Fabaceae. It belongs to the subfamily Faboideae.

Species
There are currently 10 living species of Psophocarpus:

Subgenus Psophocarpus
Sect. Psocarpus
 P. grandiflorus R.Wilczek – umuharakuku
 P. obovalis Tisser.
 P. palustris Desv.
 P. scandens (Endl.)Verdc. – anonantaka
 P. tetragonolobus (L.) DC. – asparagus bean, princess bean, four-angled bean, winged bean
Sect. Unifoliate
 P. lecomtei Tisser.
 P. monophyllus Harms
Subgenus Vignopsis
 P. indicus Wild. – goa bean, winged bean 
 P. lancifolius Harms
 P. lukafuensis (De Wild.)R.Wilczek

Notes 

Phaseoleae
Fabaceae genera